John C Verhoeven (born July 3, 1952) is a retired Major League Baseball pitcher. He played four seasons in the majors for the California Angels, Chicago White Sox, and Minnesota Twins. He has been the head coach at Biola University in La Mirada, California from 1998 to 2013. He currently is an assistant pitching coach at Azusa Pacific University.

References

California Angels players
Chicago White Sox players
Minnesota Twins players
Syracuse Chiefs players
1952 births
Living people
La Verne Leopards baseball players
Westmont Warriors baseball players
Biola Eagles baseball coaches
Major League Baseball pitchers
Baseball players from California
El Paso Diablos players
Iowa Oaks players
Pawtucket Red Sox players
Quad Cities Angels players
Salt Lake City Gulls players
Toledo Mud Hens players